Larry Marvin Littleton (born April 3, 1954) is an American former professional baseball outfielder who played for the Cleveland Indians during the 1981 baseball season.  He shares with Mike Potter the Major League Baseball record for at-bats without a hit by a non-pitcher, with 23.

References

External links

1954 births
Living people
Cleveland Indians players
Major League Baseball outfielders
Baseball players from Charlotte, North Carolina
Middle Georgia Warriors baseball players
Charleston Charlies players
Portland Beavers players
Salem Pirates players
Shreveport Captains players
Tacoma Tigers players
Toledo Mud Hens players